Charles Ronald Jacobs (28 October 1928 – 10 November 2002) was an English Rugby Union player. He went to Oakham School in Rutland, where he captained the first XV in 1945. He studied agriculture at the University of Nottingham.

Jacobs played a club record 470 games for Northampton over a 17-year period and appeared 29 times for England - captaining them for his final two games in 1964.

After retiring from playing, Jacobs remained involved in Rugby and became president of the Rugby Football Union in 1983 and was tour manager during the controversial 1984 England rugby union tour of South Africa.

References

External links
Independent obituary
Northampton obituary
Northampton Hall of Fame profile

1928 births
2002 deaths
Rugby union props
English rugby union administrators
England international rugby union players
People from Whittlesey
Barbarian F.C. players
Rugby union players from Cambridgeshire
East Midlands RFU players